The Presidential Security Service (SBP) is a federal government agency concerned with the tasks related to the protection of the President of Russia and the Prime Minister of Russia with their respective families and residences. It traces its origin to the USSR's Ninth Chief Directorate of the KGB. The first official that served as the head of the agency was Alexander Korzhakov, a general of the KGB.

Structure and command
From 2000 to 2013, the position of the head of the Presidential Protection Service was held by the General Viktor Zolotov. 

The agency had about 2,500 personnel in 2007, as suggested by a publication in the Western press.

Psychological Security Dept.
The Psychological Security Department is the branch of the Presidential Security Service that is responsible for analyzing intelligence about threats to the life of the president. The Department operates a panel of experts from several intelligence services, such as GRU, FSB, and SVR.

Heads of Presidential Security Service
 Alexander Korzhakov (1991–1996)
 Yuri Krapivin (1996)
 Anatoly Kuznetsov (1996–2000)
 Viktor Zolotov (May 18, 2000 – September 2013)
 Oleg Klementiyev (September 2013 – June 2015)
 Dmitry Kochnev (June 2015 – May 2016)
 Alexey Rubezhnoy (since June 2016)

See also
Federal Protective Service (FSO)
Kremlin Regiment
Presidential Security Service (Belarus)
Praetorian Guard

References

Protective security units
Government agencies established in 1993
1993 establishments in Russia